Matúš Paukner (born 20 June 1991) is a Slovak footballer who plays for Bruck/Leitha as a forward.

Honours

Individual
Slovak second division top scorer: 2014-15

References

External links
FC Nitra profile 

1991 births
Living people
Slovak footballers
Association football forwards
FC Nitra players
Partizán Bardejov players
TJ OFC Gabčíkovo players
Békéscsaba 1912 Előre footballers
FC Spartak Trnava players
ŠKF Sereď players
SV Horn players
SC Wiener Neustadt players
Slovak Super Liga players
2. Liga (Slovakia) players
Nemzeti Bajnokság I players
2. Liga (Austria) players
Austrian Regionalliga players
Expatriate footballers in Hungary
Expatriate footballers in Austria
Sportspeople from Nitra